Chedworth Park, also known simply as Chedworth, is a suburb in eastern Hamilton in New Zealand. It was defined as a suburb of Hamilton in 1974.

Chedworth was named by Chedworth Park Co. Ltd in 1963. In 1959 they bought  for subdivision. Chedworth Properties later created over 4,000 sections in Sherwood Park, Rototuna, Greenhill Park,  Hillcrest and Fairview.

Chedworth has 3 playgrounds, Chedworth Park, Hillary Park and Hukanui Oaks.

Demographics

Chedworth had a population of 1,821 at the 2018 New Zealand census, an increase of 105 people (6.1%) since the 2013 census, and an increase of 99 people (5.7%) since the 2006 census. There were 639 households, comprising 885 males and 933 females, giving a sex ratio of 0.95 males per female. The median age was 38.7 years (compared with 37.4 years nationally), with 390 people (21.4%) aged under 15 years, 321 (17.6%) aged 15 to 29, 792 (43.5%) aged 30 to 64, and 321 (17.6%) aged 65 or older.

Ethnicities were 75.8% European/Pākehā, 12.5% Māori, 3.6% Pacific peoples, 15.2% Asian, and 3.5% other ethnicities. People may identify with more than one ethnicity.

The percentage of people born overseas was 25.5, compared with 27.1% nationally.

Although some people chose not to answer the census's question about religious affiliation, 42.5% had no religion, 45.6% were Christian, 0.5% had Māori religious beliefs, 1.0% were Hindu, 1.5% were Muslim, 1.5% were Buddhist and 1.5% had other religions.

Of those at least 15 years old, 423 (29.6%) people had a bachelor's or higher degree, and 201 (14.0%) people had no formal qualifications. The median income was $34,400, compared with $31,800 nationally. 327 people (22.9%) earned over $70,000 compared to 17.2% nationally. The employment status of those at least 15 was that 681 (47.6%) people were employed full-time, 228 (15.9%) were part-time, and 51 (3.6%) were unemployed.

See also
 List of streets in Hamilton
Suburbs of Hamilton, New Zealand

References

Suburbs of Hamilton, New Zealand